

Canadian Football News in 1883
The Ontario Rugby Football Union was formed on January 6, 1883.  The Quebec Rugby Football Union would organize ten days later.

Final regular season standings
Note: GP = Games Played, W = Wins, L = Losses, T = Ties, PF = Points For, PA = Points Against, Pts = Points

Bold text means that they have clinched the playoffs

League Champions

ORFU Semi-Finals

ORFU Final

Canadian Dominion Football Championship
No dominion championship was played.

References

 
Canadian Football League seasons